Ramona Farcău (former Maier; born 14 July 1979) is a Romanian retired handballer. She competed at the 2008 Summer Olympics in Beijing, where she was top goalscorer with a total of 56 goals, and also voted into the All-star team. She also competed at the 2000 Summer Olympics.

International honours
EHF Champions League:
Finalist: 2010
Semifinalist: 2009, 2012, 2013
EHF Champions Trophy:
Winner: 2007
EHF Cup Winners' Cup:
Winner: 2007
World Championship:
Silver Medalist: 2005
Fourth Place: 2007

Individual awards
 Romanian National League Top Scorer: 2005

References

External links

1979 births
Living people
People from Zalău
Romanian female handball players
Olympic handball players of Romania
Handball players at the 2000 Summer Olympics
Handball players at the 2008 Summer Olympics
SCM Râmnicu Vâlcea (handball) players